Ballplay is an unincorporated community and census-designated place (CDP) in Etowah County, Alabama, United States. Its population was 1,437 as of the 2020 census.

History
Ballplay was so named because Native Americans would play stickball at the site in order to resolve disputes between tribes. A post office was established at Ballplay in 1840, and remained in operation until it was discontinued in 1905.

References

Census-designated places in Etowah County, Alabama
Census-designated places in Alabama
Unincorporated communities in Alabama
Unincorporated communities in Etowah County, Alabama